Moon Bay is a bay  wide which recedes  between Edinburgh Hill and Renier Point, on the east side of Livingston Island, in the South Shetland Islands off Antarctica. The glaciers Sopot Ice Piedmont, Iskar, Huron, Struma, Kaliakra, Panega and Debelt feed the bay. Both Half Moon Island and Elemag Reef are lying in Moon Bay.

The bay was known to sealers in the area as early as 1821. It was recharted in 1935 by Discovery Investigations personnel on the Discovery II, and probably named by them for nearby Half Moon Island, which lies in the entrance to the bay.

Maps
 South Shetland Islands. Scale 1:200000 topographic map. DOS 610 Sheet W 62 60. Tolworth, UK, 1968.
 South Shetland Islands. Scale 1:200000 topographic map. DOS 610 Sheet W 62 58. Tolworth, UK, 1968.
 Islas Livingston y Decepción.  Mapa topográfico a escala 1:100000.  Madrid: Servicio Geográfico del Ejército, 1991.
 L.L. Ivanov et al. Antarctica: Livingston Island and Greenwich Island, South Shetland Islands. Scale 1:100000 topographic map. Sofia: Antarctic Place-names Commission of Bulgaria, 2005.
 L.L. Ivanov. Antarctica: Livingston Island and Greenwich, Robert, Snow and Smith Islands. Scale 1:120000 topographic map.  Troyan: Manfred Wörner Foundation, 2009.  
 Antarctic Digital Database (ADD). Scale 1:250000 topographic map of Antarctica. Scientific Committee on Antarctic Research (SCAR), 1993–2016.

References

 SCAR Composite Gazetteer of Antarctica

Bays of Livingston Island